Li Xueyong (born September 1950) is a Chinese politician. He served as Governor of Jiangsu Province from 2010 to 2015. An academic-turned-politician, Li served for many years in the Ministry of Science and Technology.

Career
Li was born in Shijiazhuang, Hebei province. In 1968, he began working for the Heilongjiang Production and Construction Corps as a soldier and labourer.  He joined the Chinese Communist Party in March 1974, in the latter stages of the Cultural Revolution.  In 1977, he became a factory worker at a pharmaceutical plant in Beijing.

After the Cultural Revolution, he attended Beijing University of Chemical Technology, where he studied polymers. He stayed at his alma mater after graduation to become an instructor.  In 1984 he joined the National Science Commission, where he began to climb through the organization's administrative ranks. He worked at the commission until September 1995 when he was transferred to Xi'an to serve as vice mayor. In March 1998 he became Vice Minister of Science and Technology. In April 2007 he was promoted to party branch secretary. Because the ministry at the time was not headed by a member of the Communist Party, Li's position as party branch chief made him a minister-level official.

On December 7, 2010, he was named acting governor of Jiangsu province, confirmed on February 14, 2011. He retired in November 2015 due to mandated retirement rules, which called for the retirement of all provincial-ministerial level officials at age 65; he was succeeded by Shi Taifeng. After retiring from 'frontline' politics, he joined the National People's Congress Financial and Economic Affairs Committee as a deputy chair.

Li was a member of the 17th and 18th Central Committees of the Chinese Communist Party.

References

People's Republic of China politicians from Heilongjiang
Living people
Chinese Communist Party politicians from Heilongjiang
Governors of Jiangsu
People from Yichun, Heilongjiang
Presidents of the Organising Committees for the Olympic Games
1950 births